Katepwa Beach is a former resort village in the Canadian province of Saskatchewan within Census Division No. 6. It is now part of the District of Katepwa.

Located on the south side of Katepwa Beach is Katepwa Point Provincial Park and on the east side are two gold courses. Katepwa Beach Golf Course is an 18-hole course and Katepwa Family Nine Golf Course is a 9-hole course.

History 
Katepwa Beach incorporated as a resort village on August 1, 1957 under the official name of the Summer Resort Village of Katepwa Beach. The resort village changed its official name to the Resort Village of Katepwa Beach on May 13, 1992. It, and the resort villages of Katepwa South and Sandy Beach, amalgamated on July 24, 2004 to form the Resort Village of the District of Katepwa.

Demographics 

Government 
The former Resort Village of Katepwa Beach has been governed by the District of Katepwa since the 2004 amalgamation. Katepwa Beach is in Ward 2, which is represented by councillors Stephen Alport, Scott Baber and Garry Huntington, . The District of Katepwa's mayor is Rick Pattison and its administrator is Gail E. Sloan.

See also 
List of communities in Saskatchewan
List of municipalities in Saskatchewan
List of resort villages in Saskatchewan

References 

Former resort villages in Saskatchewan
Unincorporated communities in Saskatchewan
Populated places disestablished in 2004
Abernethy No. 186, Saskatchewan
Division No. 6, Saskatchewan